Abel Polo, known by his stage name Abel el'toro (born 17 June 1971), is a DJ, producer and promoter from Sydney, Australia.

Biography

Early life
Polo describes his Spanish-Australian family as "an artistic family who encouraged creative freedom and individuality".

Polo was trained in classical piano as a child, but fell in love with hip hop culture at an early age. He learnt how to breakdance at high school, and entered a Sydney breakdancing competition that was judged by Lucinda Dickey—played "Kelly" in the movie Breakin—and subsequently won second prize.

In 1986, during the birth of house and acid house, Polo attended his first dance party, "R.A.T", which was held at Bondi Pavilion. The R.A.T. experience inspired him to explore the art of DJ mixing with two turntables and vinyl records in his parents garage.

DJ career
Polo made the transition to professional DJing and promotion in 1991—his first DJ gig was at "The Trap Door" in Sydney. Abel was voted "DJ of the Year" by E-CLIPSE Rave Radio in 1992, and the following year, his resident club night, "Stun" at Neo Pharaoh, was declared 1993's "Techno Club of the Year" by 3D World Magazine.

Polo later headlined Sydney's biggest rave parties and festivals, along with DJs Nick the Fish, Jumping Jack, Pee Wee Ferris, GT, Sugar Ray, Paul Holden and Phil Smart.

In 1994, Polo toured through India, including Goa and Pune, DJing alongside friend Ray Castle, Raja Ram and Sven Vath. In 1999, Polo embarked on a European tour to visit Spain, and played at Amnesia's Cream in Ibiza. Spain was followed by the Love Parade in Berlin, Germany, and then London, England and Zurich, Switzerland. In 2001, Polo completed a tour of Hong Kong.

In addition to playing at Sydney's Big Day Out and Homebake music festivals, Polo supported the following touring acts at the Hordern Pavilion: The Chemical Brothers, Primal Scream, Carl Cox, Judge Jules, The Black Eyed Peas, Basement Jaxx, Daft Punk, Speedy J, Fatboy Slim, Paul Van Dyk, Laurent Garnier, The Shamen, The ORB, DJ Misjah & DJ Tim, Lenny Dee, DJ Slipmatt, Jeff Mills, Joey Beltram, DJ Sasha, John Digweed and Deep Dish.

Promoter career
Polo's first event as a promoter was the rave, "All in the Bubble of Yum". Polo's early success in the promotion of events led him to partner with Sydney DJ Ming D for the "Happy Valley" event held at Windsor, New South Wales, Australia, in 1991. Along with his brother Alex Polo, he catered to Sydney's rave scene by organising parties in obscure venues, such as the "Midnight Madness" raves of the 1990s (held at the Darling Harbour Fun Park).

Polo later promoted various parties, including "Bent", held at the Cell Block Theatre and The Australian Technology Park; "Platform 31", held at Central Station's disused Mortuary Railway station; and "Watch Wyle U Dance", held at The Footbridge Theatre, Sydney University. By the middle of the 1990s, Polo and friend DJ Oscar Goldman decided that Sydney needed a midweek club night where "new school" breakbeat and "old school" hip hop could be heard—"Warm Up" at Mr Goodbar was the result. Warm Up, which lasted for six years, helped to launch several Australian DJ careers, and featured regular appearances by The Rapid Fire Breakers.

Other projects 
Polo's first band "The Hoong & I" played a series of live shows from 1994 to 1999, including The Byron Bay Arts and Music Festival, in Byron Bay, Australia, and The Strawberry Fields festival in the Gold Coast hinterland, Australia.

Polo later formed the band "The Boogaloo Crew" in 2001, which recently performed at an ARIA Awards after-party with Jessica Mauboy and Kimbra. As of 2014, the Boogaloo Crew remains active and supported shows for Dimitri from Paris and Pete Tong, as well as club and corporate events, such as Cargo Bar, Home, a Bacardi event at Randwick Racecourse, Sydney, and a Google event at Fox Studios, Sydney.

Personal life 
Polo enjoys snowboarding and embarked on a DJ/snowboarding tour with Snow Wave New Zealand (Auckland, Wellington, Christchurch, Queenstown), as well as Mt Hotham, Victoria, Australia, and Sydney's Perisher Valley.

Discography

Remixing and production

DJ mix compilations

References

External links 
 Official website

1971 births
Living people
Australian DJs